Les Saintes Airport  is an airport serving the archipelago of Îles des Saintes, French West Indies. It is on an isthmus in the middle of Terre-de-Haut Island, a  dependency of Guadeloupe.

A special pilot license endorsement is required to land here.

See also

Transport in Guadeloupe
List of airports in Guadeloupe

References

External links
OurAirports - Terre-de-Haut
SkyVector - Les Saintes
OpenStreetMap - Les Saintes
Picture 
 s and take off vidéo 09/2019

Airport
Airports in the dependencies of Guadeloupe